The Secret Sin is a surviving 1915 silent film drama produced by Jesse Lasky and distributed by Paramount Pictures. It was directed by Frank Reicher and starred Blanche Sweet, Thomas Meighan and Sessue Hayakawa. This film often thought lost actually survives at the Library of Congress and along with a few  other surviving Lasky features from 1915-17 allows viewing of Blanche Sweet during her Paramount period immediately after she left D. W. Griffiths employ. In this film Sweet has a rare chance to act in a double exposure scene playing two different characters.

Cast
Blanche Sweet - Edith Martin/Grace Martin
Hal Clements - Dan Martin
Sessue Hayakawa - Lin Foo
Alice Knowland - Mrs. Martin
Thomas Meighan - Jack Herron

See also
Blanche Sweet filmography

References

External links

The Secret Sin at IMDb.com
allmovie/synopsis
lobby portrait(archived)

1915 films
American silent feature films
Films based on short fiction
Paramount Pictures films
1915 drama films
Silent American drama films
American black-and-white films
Films directed by Frank Reicher
1910s American films